Rich Dad Poor Dad is a 1997 book written by Robert T. Kiyosaki and Sharon Lechter. It advocates the importance of financial literacy (financial education), financial independence and building wealth through investing in assets, real estate investing, starting and owning businesses, as well as increasing one's financial intelligence (financial IQ).

Rich Dad Poor Dad is written in the style of a set of parables, ostensibly based on Kiyosaki's life. The titular "rich dad" is his friend's father who accumulated wealth due to entrepreneurship and savvy investing, while the "poor dad" is claimed to be Kiyosaki's own father who he says worked hard all his life but never obtained financial security. 

No one has ever proven that "Rich Dad", the man who supposedly gave Kiyosaki all his advice for wealthy living, ever existed. Nor has anyone ever documented any vast reserves of wealth earned by Kiyosaki prior to the publication of Rich Dad Poor Dad in 1997.

Reception

Praise and support 
Rich Dad Poor Dad has sold over 32 million copies in more than 51 languages across more than 109 countries,  been on the New York Times bestsellers list for over six years, launched a series of books and related products; and received positive reviews from some critics. American talk show host and media mogul Oprah Winfrey endorsed the book on her show. Another celebrity supporter is actor Will Smith, who said he taught his son about the financial responsibility by reading the book. PBS Public Television station KOCE, aired a 55-minute presentation of Kiyosaki titled "A Guide to Wealth" in 2006 which essentially summarises his Rich Dad Poor Dad book. PBS also honored him with an excellence in education award in 2005. Donald Trump did a literary collaboration with Kiyosaki in 2006 called Why We Want You To Be Rich, Two Men One Message and a second book called Midas Touch: Why Some Entrepreneurs Get Rich — And Why Most Don't in 2011.

American fashion entrepreneur and investor Daymond John has called the book one of his favorites.

Criticism 
A competing financial self help writer, John T. Reed, says, "Rich Dad, Poor Dad contains much wrong advice, much bad advice, and virtually no good advice." He also states, "Rich Dad, Poor Dad is one of the dumbest financial advice books I have ever read. It contains many factual errors and numerous extremely unlikely accounts of events that supposedly occurred."

Slate reviewer Rob Walker called the book full of nonsense, and said that Kiyosaki's claims were often vague, the narrative "fablelike", and that much of the book was "self-help boilerplate", noting the predictable common features of such books were present in Rich Dad, Poor Dad. He also criticizes Kiyosaki's conclusions about Americans, American culture, and Kiyosaki's methods. However he did not offer any specific criticism of the advice in the book, other than not liking it as a whole.

Publishing success 
The book was originally self-published in 1997 before being picked up commercially to become a New York Times bestseller. It has since sold over 32 million copies and become a household name. In his audio-book Choose to be Rich, Kiyosaki said that every publisher turned him down, and Barnes & Noble refused to stock the book initially. He places his focus upon talk shows and radio show appearances, of which The Oprah Winfrey Show had the biggest influence on book sales. In April 2017 a 20th Anniversary edition was published and in a preface to this 20th Anniversary edition Kiyosaki asserts that an estimated 40 million copies of the book had been sold globally.

References

Bibliography 
Rich Dad Poor Dad: What the Rich Teach Their Kids About Money That the Poor and Middle Class Do Not!, by Robert Kiyosaki and Sharon Lechter.  Warner Business Books, 2000. 

1997 non-fiction books
Biographies about businesspeople
Books about companies
Books by Robert Kiyosaki
Finance books
Personal finance
Personal finance education
Self-help books
Warner Books books